The Palms is a locality in the Gympie Region, Queensland, Australia.

Geography 
The predominant land use is rural residential with some areas used for farming, mostly grazing.
The Mary River forms the northern and north-eastern boundaries.

History 
The locality was named on 9 October 1982 and bounded on 1 December 2000.

References 

Gympie Region
Localities in Queensland